According to Amanda D. Lotz, the multi-channel transition began in the mid-1980s and ended in the late 1990s. During this era, multichannel television became popular in the United States, leading to the breakdown of the network era which had been dominated by the Big Three broadcast networks (NBC, ABC, and CBS). Many changes happened during this transition, such as the invention of the remote control, the video cassette player, and analog cable systems expanding viewers' choice and control. This era gave viewers more choice and control over what and when they wanted to view a program. Viewers were able to defy the networks' schedules, because they could record the program and watch it whenever they wanted, using the VCR and later the DVR. Producers adjusted to the government regulations and networks were forced to give up some of the control they had over program creation. Subscription channels emerged with no advertisements and the method for measuring audiences grew with the Nielsen People Meter. The multi-channel transition was followed by the post-network era and Second Golden Age of Television.

Background
New broadcast networks emerged such as Fox in 1986, The WB in 1995 and the UPN in 1995 and all added great competition to the original networks, NBC, ABC, and CBS. The percentage of people who watched network television dropped from 90% to 64% in the 1980s. During the 1990s, in spite of the new broadcast competitors, viewers carried on to switch from prime time viewing to cable, even though the rate wasn't as high as before. Still, broadcast networks (ABC, CBS, FOX, NBC, The WB, and UPN) gathered an average of only 58 percent of those watching television at the end of the 1999–2000 season, and only 46 percent in the final of the 2004–2005 season.

The remote control became standard on most television sets in the 1980s and that helped the viewers break away from the network era. The VCR further helped viewers to break away from the network era by enabling them to record a program and view it when they wanted to. The VCR also allowed people to build personal libraries. All of these new technologies allowed the viewer greater choice and control over specific media.

The emergence of so many new networks and channels changed the type of programming produced in order to gain more ratings points. Producers and advertisers were now able to target specific people and appeal to a narrower group. The variety show genre, in particular, was made obsolete by the change; none has lasted more than a single season since 1991, and the genre remains one of the least frequently seen in reruns. The ability for cable channels to succeed with smaller audiences made broadcasters' mission more difficult, because viewers now had the option to choose which program would satisfy their needs. Even though cable was readily available, that didn't mean that the viewer would receive every channel they wanted. Cable was then broken down into separate tiers and cable companies offered different packages for different geographic areas. Cable allowed viewers to have special interest in certain programs. The viewers found what channels or shows they liked best once cable was introduced.

During the network era there were only three networks NBC, ABC, and CBS. With the multi-channel transition production companies now had the upper hand with more networks to buy their shows. Where once the networks had control the production companies now held control. In order to maintain their own viability, the major networks lobbied the FCC to repeal the Financial Interest and Syndication Rules, which had separated syndicators from networks in 1971; the FCC obliged in 1991, allowing more vertical integration.

New distribution during the multi-channel transition
During the multi-channel transition, distribution windows expanded to include cable networks, direct sale on VCR tapes, and then DVD and VOD (Video On Demand). More recently they have also come to encompass Internet websites, where episodes can be downloaded or streamed. There has been such a high growing variety of ways for networks to reach viewers, which has also decreased some of the risk of unconventional programs, because new distribution routes provide opportunities to make money on shows that fail to achieve high ratings during network runs. Internet distribution also provides a venue for additional and supplemental programming.

Before the multi-channel transition, only signals broadcast over the air could be received on television in the home. Later, a range of possibilities developed. Cable television and satellite television became common mechanisms of delivery, and companies such as AT&T and Verizon also joined the competition of distribution during the mid-2000s. In 2006, broadband internet distribution of video became overwhelmingly popular, which diminished the domination of cable and satellite as the only source for most channels to be able to reach the home.

See also

History of television
Golden Age of Television (1940s–60s)
1980s in television
1990s in television
Network era
Post-network era
Golden Age of Television (2000s–present)
Multichannel television in the United States
Streaming television

References

History of television in the United States
History of television
Television studies
Television in the United States
1980s in American television
1990s in American television
1980s in television
1990s in television